Andre Jin Coquillard (born 15 January 1991) is a South Korean rugby sevens player. He competed in the men's tournament at the 2020 Summer Olympics. He is the first naturalized foreign player on South Korea's national rugby team.

Coquillard was born in Seoul to an American father and a Korean mother. His mother, Kim Dong-su, was a popular fashion model in the 1980s.

In December 2021, Coquillard signed with Plum ANC.

In January 2022, Coquillard was named Alumnus of the Year at Seoul Foreign School.

Filmography

Television shows

References

External links
 

1991 births
Living people
Male rugby sevens players
Olympic rugby sevens players of South Korea
Rugby sevens players at the 2020 Summer Olympics
Sportspeople from Seoul